The purple triangle was a concentration camp badge used by the Nazis to identify Jehovah's Witnesses in Nazi Germany. The purple triangle was introduced in July 1936 with other concentration camps such as those of Dachau and Buchenwald following in 1937 and 1938. In the winter of 1935–36, before the onset of the war, Jehovah’s Witnesses have been reported to make up 20–40% of the prisoners in concentration camps. Although Jehovah's Witnesses made up the vast majority of those wearing the purple triangle (over 99%), a few members of other small pacifist religious groups were also included.

Background

Jehovah's Witnesses came into conflict with the Nazi regime because they refused to use the Hitler salute, which conflicted with their beliefs. Because refusing to use the Hitler salute was considered a crime, they were arrested, and their children attending school were expelled, detained and separated from their families. When Germany made military enlistment mandatory, they were persecuted because they refused to bear arms. Being politically neutral, they also refused to vote in the elections.

Based on Nuremberg Laws, those who were also classified as ethnic Jews wore a badge comprising a purple triangle superimposed on a yellow triangle.

See also
Identification in Nazi camps
Nazi concentration camp badges
Persecution of Jehovah's Witnesses in Nazi Germany
Religion in Nazi Germany

References

External links
 Jehovah's Witnesses Stand Firm Against Nazi Assault
US Holocaust Memorial Museum summary
"Jehovah's Witnesses in Germany" University of Minnesota's Center for Holocaust and Genocide Studies
"Jehovah's Witnesses in National Socialist concentration camps, 1933–45, by Johannes S. Wrobel, Religion, State and Society vol. 34, no. 2 (June 2006), 89–125
Purple Triangles: A Story of Spiritual Resistance by Jolene Chu, originally published in Judaism Today, No. 12, Spring 1999
Purple Triangle: An Untold Story of the Holocaust
They Triumphed Over Persecution, The Watchtower March 1, 2003

Terminology of Nazi concentration camps
Persecution of Jehovah's Witnesses
Symbols introduced in 1938
Triangles